The  is a  railway line in Miyagi Prefecture, Japan, opened by the East Japan Railway Company (JR East) on 30 May 2015. One return service a day goes to and from Onagawa.

Service outline
In addition to all-stations "Local" services, semi-fast "Rapid" services and one limited-stop "Special Rapid" service operate on the line between Sendai and Ishinomaki.

Stations
O - all trains stop◇ - some trains stop△ - Sendai bound trains only stop| - trains do not stop

Rolling stock
Senseki-Tohoku Line services use a fleet of new HB-E210 series 2-car hybrid diesel multiple unit (DMU) trains, mostly operated as four-car formations.

History
Government approval to build the new 0.3 km connecting line between the existing Tohoku Main Line and Senseki Line was granted in March 2013. In July 2013, JR East announced its plans to build a fleet of new two-car HB-E210 series hybrid DMUs to be used on through services between Sendai and Ishinomaki via the new line.
The Senseki-Tohoku Line name for the new through services was formally announced in July 2014. The official opening date of 30 May 2015 was announced by JR East in January 2015. The opening of the Senseki-Tōhoku Line and the resumption of the entire Senseki Line were celebrated in the ceremony held at Nobiru Station on 30 May 2015 with Yoshihiro Murai, the Governor of Miyagi Prefecture.

References

External links
 26 February 2015 JR East press release 

Lines of East Japan Railway Company
Railway lines opened in 2015
1067 mm gauge railways in Japan
2015 establishments in Japan